Bizerte or Bizerta the classical Hippo, is a city of Bizerte Governorate in Tunisia. It is the northernmost city in Africa, located 65 km (40mil) north of the capital Tunis. It is also known as the last town to remain under French control after the rest of the country won its independence from France. The city had 142,966 inhabitants in 2014.

Names
Hippo is the latinization of a Punic name, probably related to the word ûbôn, meaning "harbor". To distinguish it from Hippo Regius (the modern Annaba, in Algeria), the Greeks and Romans used several epithets. Its Arabic name Banzart and the French and English forms derived from it all represent phonetic developments of its ancient name.

History

Later history
Arab armies took Bizerte in 647 in their first invasion of the area, but the city reverted to control from Constantinople until the Byzantines were defeated and finally driven from North Africa in 695–98. The troops of Charles V of the Holy Roman Empire captured the city in 1535; the Turks took it in 1574. The city then became a corsair harbour and struggled against the French and the Venetians.

With its occupation of Tunisia in 1881, France gained control of Bizerte and built a large naval harbour in the city.

In 1924, after the French government officially recognized the Soviet Union (USSR), the western military fleet of White Russia that had been kept in the port of Bizerte was returned to the Soviet government. The ships were never moved from the port and finally were sold there as scrap metal.

In March 1939, towards the end of the Spanish Civil War, Spanish Republican Navy Commander Miguel Buiza ordered the evacuation of the bulk of the Republican fleet. Three cruisers, eight destroyers and two submarines left Cartagena harbor and reached Bizerte, where the French authorities impounded them.

During the Second World War, the German and Italian armies occupied Bizerte until Allied troops defeated them on 7 May 1943. During the fighting between the Allied forces and the German Army, many of the city's inhabitants fled to the countryside or to Tunis. The city suffered significant damage during the battle.

Due to Bizerte's strategic location on the Mediterranean, France retained control of the city and her naval base after Tunisian independence in 1956. 
In 1961 Tunisian forces blockaded the area of Bizerte and demanded French withdrawal. The face-off escalated when a French helicopter took off and drew fire.  The French brought in reinforcements; when these were fired upon, France took decisive military action against the Tunisian forces. Using superior weapons and decisive force the French took Bizerte and Menzel Bourguiba.  During three days in July 1961, 700 Tunisians died (1200 wounded); the French lost 24 dead (100 wounded).

Meetings at the UN Security Council and other international pressure moved France to agreement; the French military finally abandoned Bizerte on 15 October 1963.

Geography

Location
Bizerte is on a section of widened inlet and east-facing coast of the north coast of Tunisia, 15 kilometres from Ras ben Sakka (the northernmost point in Africa on the Mediterranean Sea), 20 kilometers northeast of the Ichkeul lake (a World Heritage Site), 30 kilometers (18 miles) north of the archaeological site of Utica and 65 kilometers north of Tunis.

West of the city there are coastal hills forming an outcrop of the Tell Atlas with well-conserved woods and vantage points.  Its associated beaches include Sidi Salem, La Grotte, Rasenjela, and Al Rimel.  It is on a section of Mediterranean climate coastline, close to Sardinia and Sicily, as opposed to coasts in the south of the country which have a year-round dry desert climate.

The city is centered on the north shore of the canal of Bizerte linking the Mediterranean Sea to a tidal lake, the Lac de Bizerte which is larger than all parts of the town combined, to the immediate south.  Built-up areas are in three directions:
South-west along the widening canal with jetties at Pecherie and Jarrouba, the latter associated with Bizerte-Sidi Ahmed Air Base adjoining the opening of the lake and military/rescue heliport.  
North are Sidi Salam and Corniche. They are within meters of the coast and on coast-facing slopes of the Ain Berda, a range of hills toward Cap Blanc, a small headland in the Ain Damou Plage natural conservation area. 
Zarzouna, Menzel Jemil and Menzel Abderrahmane are on the south shore of the canal, formed by the locality of Zarzouna and the towns of Menzel Jemil and Menzel Abderrahmane, by a moveable bridge and both Menzels face the lake itself.  The rest of the isthmus on which they stand is the gently rising Foret de Remel, reaching a high point east of its forest area at Cap Zebib.

Transport

The bridge leads to the motorway A4 leading to Tunis–Carthage International Airport and the capital. On the town side the P11 passes semi-rural Louata, hugs Ichkeul Lake and branches into a western route, the P7, leading directly to Tabarka on the coast next to the Algerian border.  The P11 leads south-west to Béja, a governorate center, in the foothills of the Tell Atlas, forks into several roads at Bou Salem, a small town in a broad fertile plain, and climbs to Firnanah passing two high-altitude lakes and also approaching the north-west border with Algeria.

Climate
Bizerte enjoys a hot-summer mediterranean climate, with mild, rainy winters and hot, dry summers. The Mediterranean Sea breeze makes summers cooler and more humid than in the interior of Tunisia.

Demography 
In 2020 the estimated population of Bizerte was 182,662, with a density of 392.4/km2.

Population structure 
In 2014 the Males represented 50.3% of the population and the Females 49.7%. 
The population aged 60 years and over represented 12.4% and the urban population represented 60.4% of the population.

Demographic evolution

Architecture and landscape

Vieux Port 
Le vieux port (the old port) of Bizerte is a port with its small pool surrounded by white houses, cafes and large boats in bright colors. The old port is the most charming place in Bizerte. The quay stretches in an arc along the Siena earth ramparts of the Kasbah and the low white houses. A modest boat painted in red and green slices through the calm water, a fisherman unloads his fish for the nearby market, another weighs anchor... Bizerte presents the familiar spectacle of a small Provençal or Spanish port which would have traded its bell tower for a minaret. The old port of Bizerte comes alive particularly at the end of the day, when the terraces of the bistros invade the quays.

Medina 

The medina corresponds to the old town of Bizerte. It stretches north of the modern city, above Avenue Bourguiba, and runs along the old port to the Kasbah (the fortress). Once protected by a rampart facing inland, it was brought down during the French protectorate to assert its power over the city. The medina is a sort of labyrinth of narrow streets that intersect in all directions. In the souks, the smells change from one alley to another, according to the shops of craftsmen and their products. We do not hesitate to negotiate for any object. The names of the streets correspond to the old corporations present here: rue des armuriers, rue des carpenters, weavers, jewelers ... In narrow stalls you can see a craftsman at work. The tall octagonal-shaped minaret of the Great Mosque (dating from the 17th century) rises above the medina. At his side, the zaouïa of Sidi Mokhtar Dey, boss of Bizerte.

The Medina of Bizerte is an old town that surrounds the picturesque Old Port district. It is a bustling center of traditional crafts. In its winding labyrinth of narrow alleys and covered souks are the workshops of metalworkers and carpenters, and butchers and grocery stores. The streets are named after the artisans who live and work there: the blacksmiths on rue des Forgerons, the gunsmiths on rue des Armuriers, carpenters on rue des Menuisiers and butchers on rue des bouchers. It is a very atmospheric place to walk, and unlike the Medinas of Hammamet and Monastir, it has not been restored so it oozes with all the exotic charm of the Orient.

Kasbah 

The Kasbah is located in north of the old port, it has a single entrance from the West side. It has small dimensions: approximately 175m by 120m and has 8 towers and a walkway. It was built in the 17th century.
On the other side of the canal, the kasbah rises its ramparts above the medina: it is accessed for the beautiful view of the city, the port, the lake and the sea. The origins of this fortress go back to the time of the Byzantine occupation: rectangular in shape, a tower occupies each corner. The entrance to the kasbah is a narrow arched passageway designed to slow down any invaders attempting to enter it at the time. The interior of the fortress is a maze of small alleys lined with houses. At the foot of the north-west rampart, the market place comes alive with the cry of the merchants, and the stalls give the impression of an organized jumble. Beyond stretches the Andalusian quarter, where the Moors from Spain took refuge in the 17th century. Further along, linked by a rampart of the kasbah, we can see the silhouette of the fort of Spain, which overlooks Bizerte at an altitude of about 40 meters on a height to the north. This fort dates from 1573, built during the Turkish domination by the Pasha of Algiers. It is built so as to be able to face the artillery, composed of thirteen sides with re-entrant angles. Now far from any threat, the fort has since been redeveloped into an open-air theater, which notably hosts the Bizerte International Festival (music, dance, film).

Education

Bizerte is served by the ISG (Institut Supérieur de Gestion)

Health

There is in Bizerte a large hospital Hôpital Régional de Bizerte, one of the biggest in the region.

Economy
Bizerte's economy is very diverse. There are several military bases and year-round tourism. As a tourist centre the region is however not as popular as the eastern coast of Tunisia. There is manufacturing (textile, auto parts, cookware), fishing, fruits and vegetables, and wheat.

Miscellaneous

 The port of Bizerte is being developed into a significant Mediterranean yachting marina that was scheduled to open in May 2012. The superyacht section of the marina will be called Goga Superyacht Marina, and will have berths for yachts of up to 110m in length. It is expected that this will give a significant boost to the local economy as the yacht owners and also the hundreds of professional crew will become year-round consumers. The service industries supplying the yachts will gradually develop and bring additional employment.
 The actor Abdelmajid Lakhal was born in Bizerte.
 The Teapacks song "Lo haya lano klum" is about how bandleader Kobi Oz' family were expelled from Bizerte by the Nazis in 1942.

Titular see
Hippo Diarrhytus is a titular see of the Roman Catholic Church. In 1989–2002 it was held by Tadeusz Kondrusiewicz, then by Jose Paala Salazar, O.P. in 2002–2004 and by Manfred Grothe since 14 October 2004. The city and see of Hippo Diarrhytus should not be confused with those of Hippo Regius where Saint Augustine of Hippo was the bishop.

Serbian Army in Bizerte 1915–1919

Army 

After the Serbian army's retreat through Albania in 1915, during World War I, part of the army was transported by the French navy to their naval base in Bizerte. Serbian soldiers, and a small number of civilians, arrived in Bizerte on three occasions. In December 1915 and early 1916, after the Albanian Golgotha, then later in 1916 after the first clashes on the Salonica front in Greece and in the early 1917 when Serbian volunteers began to gather in Bizerte. During the entire war, the soldiers were transported to the Salonica front while the wounded were transported back to Tunisia. It is estimated that over 60,000 Serbian soldiers passed through the camp. The training of the volunteers was organized in the camp, education of the disabled but also the cultural events. French-Serbian dictionary was compiled and published by Veselin Čajkanović in Bizerte. Out of 7,000 copies, 5,000 and 1,000 were distributed to Serbian and French soldiers, respectively, while the remaining 1,000 copies were sold, with money being donated to the war invalids.

Serbian wounded soldiers were originally placed in the Lambert barrack. Almost 200 barracks were built in the camp complex. Citizens of Bizerte, French soldiers and administration were highly obliging to the Serbs, especially the Bizerte governor, admiral Émile Guépratte. He was involved in the care of the soldiers on daily basis and organized ceremonial greetings for every ship upon arrival. The last Serbian soldiers left Bizerte on 18 August 1919. Admiral Guépratte directly disobeyed the order from the French High Command by which he was ordered to dislocate Serbs into the Sahara's hinterland. When Guépratte visited Belgrade for the first time in 1930, he was awaited by the crowd which carried the admiral on their shoulders from the Belgrade Main railway station to the Slavija Square. The street where the admiral was carried, today bears his name.

Hospitals 

In Northern Africa, Serbian wounded soldiers were treated in the hospitals in Bizerte, Tunis, Sousse, Sidi Abdala, Algiers, Oran and Annaba. From December 1915 to August 1919, a total of 41,153 Serbian soldiers were treated. In Tunisian hospitals, 833 soldiers died (typhus, malaria, wounds, hunger and frostbites). In Sidi Abdala, local population helped the Serbs providing food, medicines and nurture. A total of 1,722 people died there.

Cemeteries 
The dead in Bizerte, Sousse and Tunis were buried in the memorial ossuary on the Christian cemetery in Bizerte. Those who died in Sidi Abdala were interred on the joint French-Serbian military cemetery. Those two cemeteries are the largest of all in Northern Africa where Serbian soldiers were buried – a total of 24 cemeteries in Tunisia, Algeria and Morocco, with 3,005 buried soldiers.

Notable residents
Georges Madon (1892–1924), ace pilot
Claude Pujade-Renaud (born 1932), writer
Maurice Poli (born 1933), actor
Abdelmajid Lakhal (1939–2014), actor and theatre director
Nikita Mandryka (1940–2021), cartoonist
Lionel Duroy (born 1949), writer
Pierre Cohen (born 1950), politician
Jean-Marc Luisada (born 1958), pianist
Nabil Karoui (born 1963), politician and businessman
Mondher Kebaier (born 1970), football coach
Hassen Bejaoui, (born 1975), former footballer
Malek Jaziri (born 1984), tennis player
Hamdi Harbaoui (born 1985), footballer
Souheïl Ben Radhia (born 1985), footballer
Farouk Ben Mustapha (born 1989), footballer
Hamza Mathlouthi (born 1992), footballer
Bilel Saidani (born 1993), footballer

International relations

Sister cities
Bizerte is twinned with:

Cooperation agreement
  Clermont-Ferrand, France, (a program of rehabilitation of historic centers)
  Dunkerque, France,

Gallery

See also

 European enclaves in North Africa before 1830

Notes

References

Bibliography
 .
 .

External links
 "Bizerte" in the Encyclopedia of the Orient
 
 

 
2nd-millennium BC establishments
Catholic titular sees in Africa
Cities in Tunisia
Communes of Tunisia
Populated coastal places in Tunisia
Phoenician colonies in Tunisia
Populated places in Bizerte Governorate
Populated places established in the 2nd millennium BC
Ports and harbours of the Arab League
Transport in the Arab League